Eugene L. Murphy (c. 1900 – 1976) was an American football player and coach. He attended Columbia Prep in Portland, Oregon. He played college football for Knute Rockne's Notre Dame Fighting Irish football teams in 1921 and 1922. He coached high school football at the then Sacred Heart College (High School Division; now "Sacred Heart Cathedral Preparatory")in San Francisco for the 1925 season. In June 1927, he was hired as the athletic director and head football and baseball coach at Columbia University (renamed the University of Portland in 1935. He held that position for 10 years from 1927 to 1936. He retired in December 1936 to enter private business. He was posthumously inducted into the University of Portland Hall of Fame in 1991.

Head coaching record

College football

References

1900s births
1976 deaths
Notre Dame Fighting Irish football players
Portland Pilots athletic directors
Portland Pilots baseball coaches
Portland Pilots football coaches
Portland Pilots men's basketball coaches
High school football coaches in California